Outwood Academy Foxhills is a mixed secondary school located in Scunthorpe, North Lincolnshire, England.

History

Secondary modern school
The school opened as Foxhills Secondary School in January 1951, with room for 400 children, with nine classrooms, two housecraft or domestic science, one craft, one woodwork or metalwork, and science laboratory. It was built with Tudor sand-faced bricks from the Isle of Axholme. The school was officially opened Saturday 19 May 1951 by the Labour minister of education George Tomlinson, and his wife, with the Mayor of Scunthorpe, Fred Gough. The school cost around £110,000.

The next part of the school would cost around £85,000, to provide room for 700 children, with six more classrooms, four art and craft rooms, two gymnasiums, and another science room. The headteacher was Mr Dennis Gilgallon, who had been educated at Brigg Grammmar School; he died aged 54 on Thursday 19 November 1964 in S War Memorial Hospital, after being taken ill on Tuesday 17 November 1964. But the next phase, costing £79,000, would have to wait until 1959 for work to start.

Houses were Axholme, Trent, Berkeley and Cliff. The school was overcrowded by 1958, with 600 children in a school designed for 450.

Comprehensive
It was previously known as Foxhills School, it gained specialist status in Technology and was renamed Foxhills Technology College. Foxhills was the town's first specialist school, and then became Scunthorpe's first Performing Arts College in 2007, adding specialisms in Maths and Computing in 2008 following Government designation as Scunthorpe's first High Performing Specialist School.

It was previously a community school administered by North Lincolnshire Council, Foxhills converted to academy status on 1 August 2011 and was renamed Invenio Academy. On 1 September 2014 the academy became part of the Outwood Grange Academies Trust and was renamed Outwood Academy Foxhills.

Curriculum
Outwood Academy Foxhills offers GCSEs and BTECs as programmes of study for pupils.

References

External links
Outwood Academy Foxhills official website

1951 establishments in England
Academies in the Borough of North Lincolnshire
Educational institutions established in 1951
Foxhills
Schools in Scunthorpe
Secondary schools in the Borough of North Lincolnshire